Statistics of Liberian Premier League in season 1989.

Overview
The 1989 Liberian Premier League comprised 16 teams, and Mighty Barrolle won the championship.

League standings

References
Liberia - List of final tables (RSSSF)

Football competitions in Liberia